The Struts are a British rock band formed in Derby, Derbyshire in 2012. The band consists of lead vocalist Luke Spiller, guitarist Adam Slack, bassist Jed Elliott, and drummer Gethin Davies. 

The band has cited its influences as: Queen, The Darkness, The Rolling Stones, Aerosmith, Def Leppard, The Killers, The Smiths, Oasis, the Libertines, Michael Jackson, The Strokes, The Vaccines and My Chemical Romance.

History

Formation and early years

Singer-songwriter Luke Spiller was raised in Bristol in a Christian family. His exposure to music was mainly limited to gospel music, until the age of seven, when he discovered Michael Jackson's Off the Wall. Inspired by Jackson, his first aspirations were to be a contemporary dancer, but by the age of 11, he was listening to Led Zeppelin, Queen, AC/DC, and Leonard Cohen, and in addition to pretending to be Jackson in front of a mirror, he was imitating Bon Scott and Freddie Mercury. He began playing in bands as a teenager, only starting to sing at age 16.

In 2009, Spiller, then living in Clevedon, met Derby-based guitarist/songwriter Adam Slack, who had also been playing with bands since his teens. At the time, each of their bands were "coming apart," and Slack and Spiller quickly connected musically. Spiller moved to Derby, where he and Slack lived, wrote, and recorded together for nearly three years. They recruited mutual friends Jamie Binns and Rafe Thomas to play bass and drums. In 2012, Binns and Thomas were replaced with bassist Jed Elliott and drummer Gethin Davies, forming the Struts.

The band chose the name the Struts based on an offhand comment made at a rehearsal. Spiller said in a 2015 interview, "I was just moving around and somebody was like, 'you strut around a lot.' From then on, we knew we had a great name. We couldn't believe it hadn't been taken."
 
The band played frequently throughout the UK. They soon developed a following and released their first single, "I Just Know", in June 2012. Signed by Future Records, they were transferred to Virgin EMI after Future's demise and subsequently put out a four-track EP titled Kiss This, which includes a cover of "Royals" by Lorde.

The Struts toured extensively in England and France, and in 2014 performed for 80,000 people as the opener for the Rolling Stones in Paris. That summer, they did a 24-date tour, which included a gig at the Isle of Wight Festival. Spiller wore clothing designed for him by Zandra Rhodes, who formerly dressed Freddie Mercury. The production of Rhodes' clothing for Spiller was later featured on the BBC documentary Oh You Pretty Things: The Story of Music and Fashion.

As the Struts reputation as a live band grew, their audience increased, and their shows were frequently sold-out. Spiller's talent as a frontman was often noted by the press and reviews described him as "a force of nature" and as a "physical, mesmerising entertainer... vocally strong, expressive and blessed with excellent range".  Spiller's looks and stage presence led Roger Goodgroves of Get To the Front to describe him as "the musical love child of Freddie Mercury and Mick Jagger".

Mike Oldfield recruited Spiller to sing on his 2014 album Man on the Rocks. He ended up singing the whole album main vocals instead of just one song, as planned by Mike. "He did a much better job of sounding like a rock star than me," Oldfield said.

The Struts first television performance was on Vintage TV's 'Live Sessions,' where they appeared alongside established acts including Toyah, Nik Kershaw and Judie Tzuke. The show was recorded in January 2014 at the Bedford in Balham and aired on 20 March.  The band played two tracks, 'Kiss This' and 'Could Have Been Me'.

Everybody Wants (2014–2017)

Everybody Wants, their debut studio album, released in July 2014 in the UK. It charted in the UK and received positive reviews. In early 2015, The Struts signed to Interscope Records/Polydor and in August of that year they released the EP Have You Heard, their first U.S. release. They began a tour of the States in support of the record in September. 20 dates were sold out, including the band's Los Angeles debut at the Troubador, which sold out in 30 minutes. "Could Have Been Me", the lead single, hit No. 1 on the Spotify Viral Top 50, No. 4 on the iTunes rock singles chart, and in the Top 5 on the U.S. alternative and active rock charts, and was also the official theme song of the WWE's NXT brand's 2015 pay-per-view NXT Takeover: London. The video for the track, directed by Jonas Åkerlund, had more than 1.5 million views within two months of its Vevo debut.

The Struts relocated to Los Angeles in early 2015. Their first television appearance in America was on Jimmy Kimmel Live! in August 2015, and in September they were named "Band on the Verge" by USA Today. In December 2015 they performed on Late Night with Seth Meyers.

In January 2016, it was announced that the Struts would release a reissue of Everybody Wants on 4 March on Freesolo/Interscope Records/Universal Music Canada with five songs not included on the original UK release.

On 9 August 2016, they opened for the band Guns N' Roses for their "Not in This Lifetime" tour at AT&T Park in San Francisco, where they debuted their new single "Put Your Hands Up".

On 3 March 2017, the band released Live And Unplugged, a 5-song acoustic EP that includes a cover of "Hotline Bling".

In July 2017, they opened for the band the Who in Quebec City, playing for over 80 000 people.

On 23 September 2017, the Struts opened for the Rolling Stones during the #nofilter tour in Lucca, Italy.

On 12 October 2017, the Struts opened for the Foo Fighters at the Washington DC opening of The Anthem as part of the North American leg of the Foo Fighters' Concrete and Gold Tour.

Young & Dangerous, Touring with Foo Fighters and Body Talks Tour (2018–2019)

In June 2018, the band announced that they finished recording their second album, and it was in the final mixing stages. Luke Spiller said, "I think everyone's really going to enjoy it. We were very much aware that even though the band has lived with the first album and the songs that come with it for quite a while, for everyone else, it's relatively fresh. So I felt like it was really important to make this second album somewhat depart from the first one. Not a departure musically, I didn't want to go completely left. I think it's important to give people more of what they fall in love with." After wrapping up their tour with Foo Fighters, The Struts headlined their Body Talks tour, with bands Spirit Animal and White Reaper. The band also collaborated with American singer and songwriter Kesha for the remix of their single "Body Talks". The Struts premiered the single "Bulletproof Baby" in September, and released their second album Young & Dangerous on 26 October 2018.

Strange Days (2020–present)
On 28 August 2020, The Struts released the single "Another Hit of Showmanship" with The Strokes guitarist Albert Hammond Jr. They subsequently announced a new album and single titled Strange Days. The single and title track with Robbie Williams was released on 2 September 2020, with the music video releasing on the 9th, and the album followed on 16 October 2020. "Another Hit of Showmanship" was also a song on the album. 

On April 16, 2021, The Struts released a non-album single called "Low Key in Love" which featured Paris Jackson. Another non-album single was released on August 19, 2022.

Discography

Studio albums

EPs

Live releases

Singles

Other charting songs

Notes

Music videos

References

External links

 Official website

2012 establishments in England
English hard rock musical groups
English glam rock groups
Musical groups established in 2012
Musical quartets
Musical groups from Derby
EMI Records artists
Virgin Records artists
Polydor Records artists
Interscope Records artists